The Primetime Emmy Award for Outstanding Art Direction for a Miniseries or Movie is a retired award that was handed out annually at the Creative Arts Emmy Awards. In 2014, the category was restructured into Outstanding Production Design for a Narrative Contemporary or Fantasy Program (One Hour or More) and Outstanding Production Design for a Narrative Period Program (One Hour or More).

Winners and nominations

1950s

1960s
Outstanding Achievement in Art Direction and Scenic Design

1970s
Outstanding Art Direction for a Dramatic Program or Series

Outstanding Art Direction for a Dramatic Special

Outstanding Art Direction for a Miniseries or Movie

1980s

1990s

2000s

2010s

References

Art Direction for a Miniseries or Movie
Primetime Emmy Awards
Awards established in 1956